(born May 4, 1982) is a Japanese Nordic combined skier who has been competing since 2000. He won a gold medal in the 4 x 5 km team event at the FIS Nordic World Ski Championships 2009 in Liberec and earned his best individual finish of fifth in the 10 km individual normal hill at those same championships.

Kobayashi also competed in three Winter Olympics, earning his best finish of sixth twice (4 x 5 km team: 2006, 2010 while his best individual finish was seventh in the 10 km individual normal hill event at Vancouver in 2010.

His best World Cup finish was fourth twice, both in 7.5 km sprint events (2006, 2008). He has four individual victories, all in lesser events (One in 2001, two in 2003, and one in 2009).

References
 

1982 births
Japanese male Nordic combined skiers
Living people
Nordic combined skiers at the 2002 Winter Olympics
Nordic combined skiers at the 2006 Winter Olympics
Nordic combined skiers at the 2010 Winter Olympics
Olympic Nordic combined skiers of Japan
FIS Nordic World Ski Championships medalists in Nordic combined
Universiade medalists in nordic combined
Universiade gold medalists for Japan
Competitors at the 2003 Winter Universiade